Manchester is a town in Kennebec County, Maine, United States, located at .  The population was 2,456 at the 2020 census. The southern part of the town bordering Cobbosseecontee Lake is a popular recreation spot in central Maine, and part of the Winthrop Lakes Region. Manchester is included in the Augusta, Maine micropolitan New England City and Town Area.

History
In the early 19th century, the town was known as "The Forks". The town was named Manchester after Manchester, Massachusetts.

Geography

Demographics

2010 census
As of the census of 2010, there were 2,580 people, 1,044 households, and 761 families living in the town. The racial makeup of the town was 97.0% White, 0.3% African American, 0.3% Native American, 1.1% Asian, 0.1% from other races, and 1.2% from two or more races. Hispanic or Latino of any race were 0.5% of the population.

There were 1,044 households, of which 30.9% had children under the age of 18 living with them, 60.4% were married couples living together, 8.6% had a female householder with no husband present, 3.8% had a male householder with no wife present, and 27.1% were non-families. 19.5% of all households were made up of individuals, and 8.6% had someone living alone who was 65 years of age or older. The average household size was 2.47 and the average family size was 2.82.

The median age in the town was 46.2 years. 22.6% of residents were under the age of 18; 5.7% were between the ages of 18 and 24; 19.8% were from 25 to 44; 35.4% were from 45 to 64; and 16.5% were 65 years of age or older. The gender makeup of the town was 47.8% male and 52.2% female.

2000 census
As of the census of 2000, there were 2,465 people, 977 households, and 733 families living in the town. The racial makeup of the town was 97.81% White, 0.04% African American, 0.24% Native American, 0.37% Asian, 0.04% from other races, and 1.50% from two or more races. Hispanic or Latino of any race were 0.41% of the population.

There were 977 households, out of which 34.9% had children under the age of 18 living with them, 64.5% were married couples living together, 7.9% had a female householder with no husband present, and 24.9% were non-families. 20.3% of all households were made up of individuals, and 9.2% had someone living alone who was 65 years of age or older.  The average household size was 2.52 and the average family size was 2.90.

In the town, the population was spread out, with 24.8% under the age of 18, 5.2% from 18 to 24, 27.5% from 25 to 44, 27.4% from 45 to 64, and 15.1% who were 65 years of age or older.  The median age was 42 years. For every 100 females there were 94.6 males.  For every 100 females age 18 and over, there were 90.5 males.

The median income for a household in the town was $52,500, and the median income for a family was $59,048. Males had a median income of $43,269 versus $27,450 for females. The per capita income for the town was $28,043.  About 1.8% of families and 2.5% of the population were below the poverty line, including 2.5% of those under age 18 and 2.2% of those age 65 or over.

Notable people

 Shenna Bellows, executive director of the Maine ACLU and Democratic candidate for U.S. Senate in 2014
 Laurie G. Lachance, President, Thomas College
 Samantha Smith, schoolgirl, peace activist and child actress
 Walter Wheeler, member of the Maine House of Representatives (2002–2010)

References

External links
Manchester official site
Manchester Community Profile

 
Towns in Kennebec County, Maine